Ross Sheppard High School or École Ross Sheppard (SHEP or Ross Shep) is a high school located in a northwest neighbourhood of Coronation Park, in Edmonton, Alberta, Canada. The school colours are Colombia blue and navy blue, and it is represented by a Thunderbird, also known as a T-Bird logo. Outside the school is a totem pole with a T-Bird on top, which has been given by British Columbia's Indigenous elders, representing the school mascot. The school serves the needs of over 2,000 students attending grades 10-12, including approximately 35 international students annually. Ross Sheppard School's philosophy is based on four pillars - Academics, Arts, Athletics and Service.

Academics 
Ross Sheppard School offers the standard academic program as well as International Baccalaureate (IB), Physical Education, Careers and Technology, Fine Arts, and practical arts. Languages offered other than English include Chinese Mandarin (as part of the ECBEA program), Spanish and all levels in French.

Ross Sheppard offers the International Baccalaureate (I.B.) Diploma Program in addition to the Alberta education curriculum. During this year continue in a partial I.B. program, or continue in the regular Alberta education program. Most students take the regular Alberta education program while few students take the full program. Students complete the I.B. program while fulfilling their Alberta diploma requirements. Ross Sheppard also offers French Immersion with the first class graduating in 2008 with a bilingual diploma.

Partnering with Edmonton Public Schools and Northern Alberta Institute of Technology, Ross Sheppard provides the "Foundations of Health Sciences" course. The course allows students to receive hands-on skills in the health care field and to look to a future career in acute and long-term care or other fields with strong communication and interpersonal skills. Students can choose to pursue a career in health care immediately, or to study related post-secondary programs. Students enrolled in level 2 of the Skills Centre programs are eligible for enrollment to NAIT through the Skill Centre Project.

According to Fraser Institute, Ross Sheppard is rated as one of the top 10 best high schools out of all 25 public high schools in Edmonton, Alberta, and ninety-ninth out of two hundred sixty-two high schools in Alberta.

Arts
Ross Sheppard offers a wide range of programs in the Arts.

Athletics
Ross Sheppard offers a wide range of sports including swimming, volleyball, cross-country running, rowing, curling, rugby, water polo, cheer team, track and field, women's soccer academy, indoor soccer, elite athletes sports program, basketball, badminton, football, golf, golf academy and handball. It offers 17 sports and 40 teams, over 1,000 student athletes, multiple city and provincial championship teams, a full-time strength and condition coach and a full-time therapist. Ross Sheppard offers an extensive co-curricular program of athletics, the arts, recreational and academic interests. Facilities include as an Olympic-sized swimming pool, covered ice arena, football and track stadium, three major playing fields, tennis courts, Telus World of Science (Edmonton), and the Commonwealth bowling green and clubhouse facilities. Ross Sheppard offers an Elite Athlete Program providing flexible scheduling for student athletes competing at provincial, national and/or international levels. The school runs Hockey, Soccer and Golf Skills Academy. New for 2012-13 will be the Triathlon Academy.

Service
There are a number of student-led clubs in the school that center around helping local and international charities. 
 The Centennial Interact Club is a junior affiliate of Rotary International. In addition to the local charities it supports, student members from the Interact Club also do volunteer work in Belize during their 11th or 12th year.
 Project Green is the school's environmental club that supports local and international environmental causes.

Resource centres
Three resource centres are located throughout the school, are easily accessible and offer students support with their academic studies.
 In its main floor library is the Shep Connection Centre, where students take a number of individualized courses (online and correspondence). The school also has a special section on the main floor library with a number of mandarin resources from the Confucius Institute in Edmonton.
 On the upper floor, there is another Learning Commons, known as "the Bookloft." This new venue hosts a technology resource centre, including laptops, SMART Board and a Videoconferencing suite. The school has online access to both the University of Alberta and Edmonton Public Library Catalogues.
 Student Services is a place for students to come for assistance in aspects of High School (career counselling, personal counselling, post-secondary transition). A number of students, faculty and staff also assist international students in adapting to their new environment and making the transition into Canadian culture. Student Services is the hub for scholarship information. Over a half million dollars in scholarships are earned by Shep students each year.

The school's namesake
Ross Sheppard represented Canada in the 1924 Olympic Games in Paris, and competed in the hop, step and jump.

Sheppard went on to become a teacher, principal and school administrator, and served as superintendent of the Edmonton Public School Board from 1940 to 1955. Sheppard devised the composite high school system, offering academic, commercial, and industrial subjects, and was the first superintendent in Canada to implement the concept. During his 15 years as Superintendent of Schools, the number of permanent public schools increased from 30 to 63.

When he retired in 1955, the school board named its newest high school in his honour. Construction started in 1956, with an addition in 1958.  Sheppard’s retirement  concluded 42 years of service to the Edmonton public school system. He died 12 years later, on September 4, 1967.

Notable alumni
Ruth B – singer/songwriter
Jermaine Bucknor – basketball player
Tanika Charles – soul and R&B artist
Paul Comrie – NHL player
Jessica Gregg – Olympic short track speed skater (2010 silver medallist)
Wayne Gretzky – former NHL ice hockey player
Barb Higgins – former newscaster and journalist for CTV Calgary
Susan Humphreys – Olympic figure skater (1994), national champion (1996–97)
Mahmud Jamal - Supreme Court of Canada Justice
Myrna Kostash – writer
Hugh O'Neill  – current CFL player for the BC Lions
Annamay Pierse – Olympic swimmer (2008), world short course record holder (2009)
Dawn Richardson Wilson – Olympic bobsledder (2022)
Paula Simons – Senator and former journalist and columnist
Jamie Salé – Olympic figure skater (gold medallist)
Angela Whyte – Olympic track and field (hurdles) (2004, 2008)

Incidents
 On March 16, 1959, 19-year-old Stan Williamson opened fire with a .22 calibre rifle inside a crowded corridor of Ross Sheppard High School, killing 16-year-old Howard Gates and wounding five teenage girls. The shooting ended when three 18-year-old students held the gunman down until he could be arrested by police.
 On July 9, 2009, summer school classes were interrupted after a suspected arson broke out. Firefighters managed to contain the flames to a boy's washroom that afternoon, but the soot damage covered three floors of the northwest wing of Ross Sheppard. A quarter-million dollars worth of repair work was finished in time before classes resumed in September.
 On September 19, 2011, students at Ross Sheppard high school were sent home early Monday morning after carbon monoxide was detected to be at potentially dangerous levels. Fire alarms at the school were triggered around 8 a.m. after staff reported the smell of exhaust. The school was evacuated, with students sent to neighboring Westmount Mall, later being told to go home for the day. No injuries were reported.
 In May 2012 physics teacher Lynden Dorval became the object of local newspapers such as the Edmonton Sun, the Edmonton Journal and the National Post, when they learned he was brought before a school board hearing for giving students scores of zero if they did not hand in assignments, which went against the school's no-zero policy. On May 18, 2012 he reportedly received a letter informing him he had been suspended indefinitely. Dorval feels that not giving zeros went against his principles as an educator, whereas the school feels that zeros on assignments that were not handed in do not accurately measure learning or performance but are more a comment on a student's behaviour. In August 2014, a provincial review board ruled that Dorval "was treated unfairly in his dismissal" and ordered full repayment of salary from the day of his dismissal and a top-up of his pension. The Edmonton Public School Board were given 30 days to file an appeal to the review board.

References

External links

Official website
Ross Sheppard on Twitter
Ross Sheppard on Facebook
Ross Sheppard's YouTube Channel

High schools in Edmonton
International Baccalaureate schools in Alberta
Educational institutions established in 1957
1957 establishments in Alberta